Mark Hildesley Quayle may refer to:
Mark Quayle (advocate, b. 1770) KC, (1770-1804) Clerk of the Rolls of the Isle of Man
Mark Quayle (advocate, b. 1804) QC, (1804-1879) Clerk of the Rolls of the Isle of Man and Member of the House of Keys
Mark Quayle (advocate, b. 1841) QC, (1841-1928) Manx-born advocate and businessman